The Lok Rajputs are Hindu caste found in the state of Rajasthan in India.

History and origin

The Lok Rajput claims to descent from a small number of Panwar Rajputs that settled in the hill of Mount Abu. Owing to their isolation from Rajput groups, they evolved into a distinct community.

Present circumstances

The community is endogamous, and divided into   fourteen exogamous gotras. These  are involved in the regulating of marriages. They are a community of mainly small peasant farmers, with animal husbandry being their main secondly occupation.

See also

Natrayat Rajput
Rajput

References

Rajput clans